The 1990 edition of the Federation Professional League was the final competition to take place. Five teams from the FPL joined the National Soccer League structure following the competition.

The teams highlighted in green moved to the National Soccer League structure for the 1991 season alongside three clubs from the NSL's feeder; the OK League:

 African Wanderers
 Dangerous Darkies
 Highlands Park F.C.

References 

Federation Professional League
Football
South